The Tschierva Glacier (Romansh: Vadret da Tschierva) is a 4 km long glacier (2005) situated in the Bernina Range in the canton of Graubünden/Grisons in Switzerland. In 1973 it had an area of 6.2 km2.

See also
List of glaciers in Switzerland
Swiss Alps
Glaciers

External links
Swiss glacier monitoring network

Glaciers of Graubünden
Glaciers of the Alps
Samedan